The Haitian minority of the Dominican Republic is the largest ethnic minority in the Dominican Republic since the early 20th century.

History 
After the Dominican War of Independence ended, Haitian immigration to the Dominican Republic was focalized in the border area; this immigration was encouraged by the Haitian government and consisted of peasants who crossed the border to the Dominican Republic because of the land scarcity in Haiti; in 1874 the Haitian military occupied and de facto annexed La Miel valley and Rancho Mateo, including Veladero (now Belladère). In 1899 the Haitian government claimed the center-west and the south-west of the Dominican Republic, including western Lake Enriquillo, as it estimated that Haitians had become the majority in that area.

However, the arrival of Haitians to the rest of the country began after the United States occupation of Haiti and the Dominican Republic around 1916, when US-owned sugar companies imported, annually, thousands of Haitian workers to cut costs.

The 1935 census revealed that several border towns were of Haitian majority; between 1920 and 1935 the Haitian population in the Dominican Republic doubled. In 1936, Haiti received several of these villages located in La Miel valley after a revision of the borderline. Between 1935 and 1937 the dictator Rafael L. Trujillo imposed restrictions on foreign labor and ordered the deportation of Haitians in the border area, but these measures failed due to a corruption scheme involving Dominican military men, civil authorities, and US-owned sugar companies, in the trafficking of undocumented Haitian immigrants. After April 1937, Cuba began the deportation of thousands of Haitians; this led to the arrival of unemployed Haitians en masse to the Dominican Republic. In August 1937, amid a tour to border towns, Trujillo received complaints of looting, pillaging and cattle raiding, and people insinuated that he had no control over the Haitians. Drunk at a soirée, Trujillo decided that every Haitian should be annihilated. Lieutenant Adolf "Boy" Frappier, a German adviser to President Trujillo, advised him to use the shibboleth perejil (Spanish for "parsley") to identify Haitians by their accent, because the "r" in perejil was difficult for Haitians to pronounce properly. Thousands died along the borderland, the Northwest Line and the Cibao, and thousands more fled to Haiti. In 1975, Joaquín Balaguer, the Dominican Republic's interim Foreign Minister at the time of the massacre, put the number of dead at 17,000. Other estimates compiled by the Dominican historian Bernardo Vega went as high as 35,000. Haitians that were working for the American sugar companies, or living in the East of the country, were not harmed.

As a result of the slaughter, the Dominican Republic paid to Haiti an indemnity of US$ 525,000 (equivalent to $ million in ). The genocide sought to be justified on the pretext of fearing infiltration, but was actually also a retaliation, commented on both in national currencies, as well as having been informed by the Military Intelligence Service (the dreaded SIM), that the Haitian government was cooperating with a plan that sought to overthrow Dominican exiles.

After the events of 1937, Haitian migration to the Dominican Republic halted, until in 1952 Trujillo and the Haitian president Paul Eugène Magloire agreed on the annual shipment of thousands of Haitian laborers to work in American-owned and Dominican-owned sugar plantations, paying the Dominican government a price per head to its Haitian counterpart.

In the 1960s, after the fall of the dictatorship of Trujillo, Haitian immigration boomed: according to Joaquín Balaguer, 30,000 Haitians crossed the border between 1960 and 1965. During the administrations of Joaquín Balaguer, Antonio Guzmán and Salvador Jorge Blanco, in Dominican Republic, and the Duvaliers, in Haiti, the influx of Haitian labourers was continuous and was increasing. Every year contracts were signed between both countries for the importation of over ten thousand Haitians as temporary workers (although they were rarely returned to their country) in exchange for the payment of millions of dollars.

Haitian influence and migration has been strong on and off since the early 1800s, one of the main reasons there has always been tensions. During the early-mid 1800s, around the periods of the Haitian Revolution and the Dominican War of Independence, Haitian soldiers would massacre innocent people including children, and raped women resulting in small numbers of Dominicans having distant Haitian ancestry without even knowing. In addition, many mixed Haitian-Dominican families have been created, whether through consensual relationships or through rape. A small portion of Dominicans who've been in the country for generations are of partial or full Haitian ancestry.

Illegal Immigration 
Illegal Haitian Immigration is a big problem in the Dominican Republic, putting a strain on the Dominican economy and increasing tensions between Dominicans and Haitians. It is believed the Dominican border patrol does not protect the border effectively, partly due to the nonchalant attitude of many corrupt politicians.

Economic and social issues 

Many Haitians migrate to the Dominican Republic primarily to escape the poverty in Haiti. In 2003, 80% of all Haitians were poor (54% in extreme poverty) and 47.1% were illiterate. The country of nine million people has a fast-growing population, but over two thirds of the jobs are not in formal work places. Haiti's GDP per capita was $1,300 in 2008, or less than one-sixth of that in the Dominican Republic. As a result, hundreds of thousands of Haitians have migrated to the Dominican Republic, with some estimates of 800,000 Haitians in the country, while others believe they are more than a million. Many Haitian migrants or their descendants work in low-paid and unskilled jobs in building construction, household cleaning, and in plantations.

In 2005 Dominican President Leonel Fernández criticized that collective expulsions of Haitians were "improper and inhumane". After a delegation from the United Nations issued a preliminary report stating that it found a profound problem of racism and discrimination against people of Haitian origin, the Chancellor Dominican Carlos Morales Troncoso gave a formal statement saying "Our border with Haiti has its problems, this is our reality, and this must be understood. It’s important not to confuse national sovereignty with indifference, and not to confuse security with xenophobia"

After the earthquake that struck Haiti in 2010, the number of Haitians doubled to 2 million, most of whom illegally crossed after the border opened for international aid. Human Rights Watch estimated that 70,000 documented Haitian immigrants and 1,930,000 undocumented immigrants were living in Dominican Republic.

Before 2010, the Constitution of the Dominican Republic generally granted citizenship to anyone born in the country, except children of diplomats and persons "in transit". The 2010 constitution was amended to define all undocumented residents as "in transit". On September 23, 2013, the Dominican Republic Constitutional Court issued a ruling that retroactively applied this definition to 1929, the year Haiti and the Dominican Republic formalized the border. The decision stripped Dominican citizenship from about 210,000 people who were born in the Dominican Republic after 1929 but are descended from undocumented immigrants from Haiti. Many of the Dominican Republic-born do not have Haitian citizenship and have never been to Haiti; the decision rendered them at least temporarily stateless. Some Haitians began leaving voluntarily or in response to ethnic violence. The government set a deadline of June 17, 2015 for affected people to leave the Dominican Republic, as nighttime "bandits" threatened Haitians with violence and deportation; by August 2015 "hundreds" had been deported.

Haitian descendants who have been in the Dominican Republic for many generations tend to primarily speak a broken form of Spanish with a strong Haitian accent, even moreso than Haitian Creole similar to how many assimilated Haitian Americans speak English more than Creole. Many try to mimic Dominican cultural traits in a effort to blend in and assimilate into the native Dominican population.

Demographics 

Almost 75% of the Haitians living in the Dominican Republic have been residing in the country for less than 10 years. Almost 70% of Haitian workers earns less than 10,000 Dominican pesos (DOP) per month; about 7% earned more than 20,000 DOP per month. Those who live in urban areas earn up to 70% more than those in rural areas. The average median income is 10,262 DOP per month; in comparison, an average Dominican earns 12,441 DOP and an average non-Haitian immigrant earns 39,318 DOP per month. Just 10% of Haitians send remittances to Haiti, with 5.4% sending with a frequency of once per quarter or higher.

The 1920 Census registered 28,258 Haitians; the 1935 Census registered 52,657 Haitians. The Haitian population decreased to 18,772 in the 1950 Census, as a result of the cession of Dominican territory to Haiti in 1936, and the 1937 Parsley Massacre as well.

In 2012, there were 458,233 Haitian immigrants living in the Dominican Republic, 65.4% of them were males and 76.1% between 18 and 39 years old. Also, they represent 81.1 percent of the fixed population in the tourist area of Punta Cana (excluding the floating population, mainly Dominicans and overseas foreigners), almost all of them working for the hotels.

According to the Ministry of Health, in 2018 roughly 24% of neonates in the Dominican Republic are born to a Haitian mother, 4 years later that figure had increased to 31.9%.

Haitians in the Dominican Republic by censuses
1920: 28.258 — 3.1% of the total population
1935: 52.657— 3.6% of the total population
1950: 18.772 — 0.9% of the total population
1960: 29.350 — 1.0% of the total population
1970: 97.142 — 2.4% of the total population
1980: 113.150 (excludes urban areas)— 4.3% of the rural population
1981: Not applicable
1991: 245.000 (of Haitian origin) — 3.4% of the total population
1993: Not applicable
2002: Not applicable
2005: 196.837 — 2.35% of the total population
2010: 311.969 — 3.30% of the total population
2012: 668.145 (of Haitian origin) — 7.1% of the total population
2017: 751.080 (of Haitian origin) — 7.4% of the total population

*Immigrant censuses are italicized

Sports

Baseball

According to the president of the Confederation of Professional Baseball of the Caribbean (CBPC), Juan Francisco Puello Herrera, The inability to obtain identification documents, often result in some of these athletes not being signed by professional teams. Many players have come from the bateyes of the provinces of San Pedro de Macoris, La Romana, Haina, Nizao, Boca Chica and Barahona.  Oftentimes, their origins are kept hidden for either fear of discrimination or to alter birth records to appear younger, which is a common practice in general in the Dominican Republic. Some choose to not even keep the surname of origin, in order to not to be so easily recognized.

Basketball
According to Junior Paez and Ramón Ceballos, the administrative and eligibility directors of the Dominican Basketball Federation (FEDOMBAL), there is no record of participation of Dominican basketball players of Haitian descent.

Notable Haitian Dominicans

Political figures

Athletes

See also 
 Beheadings of Moca
 2013 Dominican Republic–Haiti diplomatic crisis
 Afro-Dominicans
 Antihaitianismo
 Dominican Republic–Haiti relations
 Haitian occupation of Santo Domingo
 Parsley Massacre
 Racism in the Dominican Republic

References

Further reading

External links 
 "Primera Encuesta Nacional de Inmigrantes (ENI-2012)" (in Spanish). Santo Domingo: Instituto Nacional de Estadística (former 'Oficina Nacional de Estadística') & United Nations Population Fund. 2012.

Dominican Republic
Dominican Republic–Haiti relations
Ethnic groups in the Dominican Republic